Evelin Vacsi (born ) is a Hungarian female volleyball player, playing as a middle-blocker. She is part of the Hungary women's national volleyball team.

She competed at the 2015 Women's European Volleyball Championship. On club level she plays for Fatum-Nyíregyháza.

References

External links

1993 births
Living people
Place of birth missing (living people)
Hungarian women's volleyball players
People from Mór
Sportspeople from Fejér County